Another Happy Day is a 2011 American drama film written and directed by Sam Levinson, in his feature directorial debut. The film stars an ensemble cast including Ellen Barkin, Kate Bosworth, Ellen Burstyn, Thomas Haden Church, Jeffrey DeMunn, Siobhan Fallon Hogan, George Kennedy, Ezra Miller, Demi Moore, Diana Scarwid and Daniel Yelsky.

It had its world premiere at the Sundance Film Festival on January 23, 2011. It was released on November 18, 2011, by Phase 4 Films.

Plot
A wedding at Lynn Hellman's parents estate hurls her into the center of touchy family dynamics.

Cast
 Ellen Barkin as Lynn Hellman
 Kate Bosworth as Alice Hellman
 Ellen Burstyn as Doris Baker
 Thomas Haden Church as Paul
 George Kennedy as Joe Baker
 Ezra Miller as Elliot Hellman
 Demi Moore as Patty
 Siobhan Fallon Hogan as Bonnie
 Michael Nardelli as Dylan
 Daniel Yelsky as Ben Hellman
 Eamon O'Rourke as Brandon
 Lola Kirke as Charlie
 Jeffrey DeMunn as Lee
 Diana Scarwid as Donna
 Pepper as Pinkybones the dog

Release
Another Happy Day was screened at the 27th Sundance Film Festival on January 23, 2011. The film also screened at South by Southwest on March 18, 2011; at the Woodstock Film Festival on September 23; at the Mill Valley Film Festival on October 12; and was given a limited release on November 18.

Critical reception
The site's critical consensus reads, "Another Happy Day features outstanding performances (Ellen Barkin's especially) but the characters are too unpleasant to endure." On Metacritic, the film holds a rating of 46 out of 100, based on 18 critics, indicating "mixed or average reviews".

Barkin received critical acclaim for her performance, with Gabe Toro of IndieWire writing it was one of the best female performances of the year. Chris Bumbray of JoBlo wrote: "A searing look at the modern family dynamic, and the way love and hate can be inter-changeable at times. Ellen Barkin is Oscar worthy.

John DeFore of The Hollywood Reporter gave the film a positive review writing: "Laugh-laced dark drama of family angst overcomes the hurdle of its wedding-weekend setting." Leah Rozen of TheWrap also gave the film a positive review writing: "Altmanesque in its sprawl and sympathetic attitude toward even its most flawed characters, Happy Day marks a mostly promising debut for director-writer Sam Levinson."

Stephen Holden of The New York Times gave the film a negative review writing: "Both anguished and histrionic and in its strongest moments very, very good. But it is also overpopulated, strident and constitutionally unable to step back and scrutinize itself." Moira McDonald of The Seattle Times also gave the film a negative review writing: "Another Happy Day becomes increasingly difficult to watch, despite its intelligence and strong cast. You wish this family well, but you're grateful to see the last of them."

References

External links
 
 
 
 
 Another Happy Day Official Site

2011 films
2011 comedy-drama films
American black comedy films
American comedy-drama films
2010s English-language films
Films about dysfunctional families
Films scored by Ólafur Arnalds
Films set in Maryland
Films shot in Michigan
American independent films
2011 independent films
Films directed by Sam Levinson
2010s American films